Lawrence Booth (1420–1480) was an archbishop and Chancellor of England.

Lawrence Booth may also refer to:

Lawrence Booth (cricket writer) (born 1975), English cricket historian and writer
Lawrence Booth, helped put out Great Seattle Fire
Lawrence Booth's Book of Visions by Maurice Manning (poet)
Larry Booth, American architect, part of the Chicago Seven (architects)